TRNSYS is a simulation program primarily used in the fields of renewable energy engineering and building simulation for passive as well as active solar design. TRNSYS is a commercial software package developed at the University of Wisconsin. 

One of its original applications was to perform dynamic simulation of the behaviour of a solar hot water system for a typical meteorological year so that the long-term cost savings of such a system could be ascertained. 

It has been used in a plethora of scientific and technical publications for system simulations of various renewable and conventional energy sources.

References

External links

Solar architecture